Swastika ( or ) is a small community founded around a mine site in Northern Ontario, Canada in 1908. Today it is within the municipal boundaries of Kirkland Lake, Ontario. It has frequently been noted on lists of unusual place names.

Swastika is a junction on the Ontario Northland Railway, where a branch to Rouyn-Noranda, Quebec leaves the ONR's main line from North Bay, Ontario to Moosonee. Until 2012, the Northlander passenger railway service between Toronto and Cochrane served the Swastika railway station with connecting bus service running along Highway 66 into downtown Kirkland Lake.

History

The town was named after the Swastika Gold Mine staked in the autumn of 1907 and incorporated on January 6, 1908.

James and William Dusty staked the claims alongside Otto Lake for the Tavistock Mining Partnership. The gold mine and town were named after the Sanskrit good-luck symbol Swastika. The Temiskaming and Northern Ontario Railway had an engineers' camp nearby as they had to construct two railway bridges as they advanced northwards. The first usage of the name Swastika occurred in their 1907 Annual Report to indicate a water tank was located at the site to meet the needs of the steam trains that opened up northern Ontario.

Prospectors and miners flocked to the area and after viewing the find at the Swastika Gold Mine they advanced even further throughout the surrounding region. In 1909 the Lucky Cross Mine adjacent to the Temiskaming and Northern Ontario Railway tracks began producing gold. A Mr. Morrisson started a farm and lodging alongside the tracks as early as 1907 and from there the community developed.

Swastika had a population of 450 by 1911, with the Lucky Cross and Swastika Mines in operation.  By 1911, a hotel and businesses were flourishing, the area to the east was heavily staked and in 1912 the major gold mines of Kirkland Lake were found and developed by Harry Oakes. Swastika was the main transportation link with the railway and communications centre. Churches, schools, community groups and organisations continued to provide the needs of the residents of the area.

The Swastika Mine was later called the Crescent Mine.

During World War II, the provincial government removed the Swastika sign and replaced it with a sign renaming the town "Winston."  The residents removed the Winston sign and replaced it with a Swastika sign with the message, "To hell with Hitler, we came up with our name first.”

1930s British socialite Unity Mitford, one of the famous Mitford sisters who were daughters to aristocrat David Freeman-Mitford, 2nd Baron Redesdale, was notorious for her extreme devotion to Adolf Hitler and support of Nazism and fascism. She was conceived in Swastika when her parents were there to investigate a gold claim investment in 1913.

In 2008, the small community of Swastika celebrated the town's centennial.

In 2021, the Ontario Northland Railway's station was demolished. On May 26, 2021 the Province of Ontario announced plans to reinstate the Northlander passenger train between Toronto and Timmins and/or Cochrane.

As of 2023, the population of Swastika is around 500 people.

References

Populated places established in 1908
Communities in Timiskaming District
Ontario
Kirkland Lake
1908 establishments in Ontario